The Donghae Bukbu Line (東海北部線, Tōkai Hokubu-sen) was a railway line of the Chosen Government Railway (Sentetsu) in Korea connecting Anbyeon with Yangyang.

History
The line was originally opened in several stages, with the first section from Anbyeon on Sentetsu's Gyeongwon Line to Heupgok being opened in 1929, and finally reaching Yangyang in 1937. Plans existed to extend the line south from Yangyang to Pohang Station, where it would have connected with the Donghae Nambu Line; however, this extension could not be completed before Japan's defeat in the Pacific War, and the plans were abandoned.

After the partition of Korea, the line was split between the North and South, with the section from Anbyeon to Samilpo becoming the Kŭmgangsan Ch'ŏngnyŏn Line in the north, while the section from Chogu to Yangyang became the Donghae Bukbu Line operated by the Korean National Railroad.

Route

References

Railway lines in Korea
Railway lines opened in 1929
Sentetsu railway lines